The Longfellow Mountains are a subrange of the Appalachian Mountains System, located within the North Maine Woods region of northwestern Maine. They extend across the state from northern New Hampshire northeastward to the Canadian provinces of New Brunswick and Quebec.

In 1959, the Maine Legislature voted to give the various mountains and ranges in northwest Maine the collective name of the Longfellow Mountains, in honor of the Maine-born poet Henry Wadsworth Longfellow (1807–1882).

This and most of Maine's mountain ranges and mountain peaks are part of the Appalachian Mountains System.

See also 
 List of mountains of Maine

References

Mountain ranges of Maine
Subranges of the Appalachian Mountains
North Maine Woods
Landforms of Aroostook County, Maine
Mountains of Franklin County, Maine
Mountains of Oxford County, Maine
Mountains of Penobscot County, Maine
Mountains of Piscataquis County, Maine
Mountains of Somerset County, Maine